Callocosmeta is a monotypic genus of tineid moths. It contains the single species Callocosmeta eupicta, which is native to Madagascar.

References

Tineidae
Monotypic moth genera
Moths of Madagascar
Tineidae genera